Evergestis mundalis is a species of moth in the family Crambidae described by Achille Guenée in 1854. It is found in France, Spain, Italy and Greece. In the east, the range extends to Armenia.

The wingspan is about 26 mm.

The larvae feed on Brassicaceae species, possibly Biscutella laevigata and Erysimum nevadense.

Subspecies
Evergestis mundalis mundalis
Evergestis mundalis permundalis Marion, 1960

References

Moths described in 1854
Evergestis
Moths of Europe